Billboard Top Hits: 1978 is a compilation album released by Rhino Records in 1991, featuring ten hit recordings from 1978.

The track lineup includes four songs that reached the top of the Billboard Hot 100 chart. The remaining six songs each reached the top ten of the Hot 100.

Track listing

Track information and credits were taken from the album's liner notes.

References

1991 compilation albums
Billboard Top Hits albums
Rhino Records compilation albums